is a highway in Japan on the island of Kyūshū which runs from Saga City in Saga Prefecture to Togitsu in Nagasaki Prefecture. From Kōhoku it runs along the Ariake Sea towards Isahaya. Hence, that portion of the road runs mostly parallel to the Nagasaki Main Line.

Route description
Length: 112.3 km (69.8 mi)
Origin: Saga (junction with Route 264)
Terminus: Togitsu (junction with Route 206)

History
1953-05-28 - Second Class National Highway 207 (from Saga to Isahaya)
1965-04-01 - General National Highway 207 (from Saga to Isahaya)
1982-04-01 - General National Highway 207 (from Saga to Togitsu)

Overlapping sections
From Ogi (Maemitsue intersection) to Kōhoku (Higashibun intersection), and from Isahaya to Tarami (Kikitsu Station east entrance intersection): Route 34
From Isahaya (Obunakoshi intersection) to Tarami (Kikitsu Station east entrance intersection): Route 57
From Shiroishi (Ariake-chō Meguritsu intersection) to Kashima (Shimego intersection): Route 444

Municipalities passed through
Saga Prefecture
Saga, Kubota, Ogi, Kōhoku, Shiroishi, Kashima, Tara
Nagasaki Prefecture
Isahaya, Nagayo, Togitsu

Main connecting roads

Route 208, Route 263, Route 204 (Saga)
Route 34 (Ogi, Kōhoku, Isahaya)
Route 444 (Shiroishi, Kashima)
Route 498 (Kashima)
Route 57 (Isahaya)
Route 206 (Togitsu)

Roadside stations
Kashima Roadside Station

References

207
Roads in Nagasaki Prefecture
Roads in Saga Prefecture